"Don't Let Me Die" is a song by American rapper Jay-Z and American singer R. Kelly. It is the second single from their collaboration album Unfinished Business (2004). The song was produced by Tone of the Trackmasters and Kelly, with co-production from Alexander "Spanador" Mosley.

Critical reception
Tom Breihan of Pitchfork wrote that the song's gospel choir, which he described as "bazonkers", was one of the better aspects of the Trackmasters' "clean" sound throughout Unfinished Business. Nathan Rabin of The A.V. Club wrote the song "amplifies the disc's abundant cheese to operatic levels, complete with a choir and an unhinged Kelly vocal".

In popular culture
In the 2013 film G.I. Joe: Retaliation, Roadblock invokes Jay-Z's lyrics from the song: "Whatever deity guides my life / Dear Lord, don't let me die tonight".

Charts

Release history

References

2004 singles
2004 songs
Jay-Z songs
R. Kelly songs
Songs written by Jay-Z
Songs written by R. Kelly
Songs written by Samuel Barnes (songwriter)
Songs written by Jean-Claude Olivier
Roc-A-Fella Records singles
Def Jam Recordings singles